Stenotis may refer to:
 Stenotis (insect), a genus of beetles in the family Curculionidae
 Stenotis (plant), a genus of flowering plants in the family Rubiaceae
 , a genus of mollusks in the family Vanikoridae, unknown status, described in 1863 by Adams